Requiem is the fourth album by Florida metal band The Autumn Offering. It was released on June 9, 2009 through Victory Records. This is the last album to feature any of the original members as Matt Johnson quit the band in 2010. According to the group, the album contains "by far the band's most ambitious and dense material yet. Longer songs, complex rhythms, and dynamic vocals fill out this 11-track monster."

In April 2009, vocalist Matt McChesney gave the website MetalSucks a preview of Requiem. After previously giving The Autumn Offering's 2007 release Fear Will Cast No Shadow a very negative review, Axl Rosenberg of MetalSucks was optimistic about this release stating, "I'm certainly gonna give this band another chance."

Track listing
 "The Curtain Hits the Cast" - 3:38
 "Narcosis" - 3:31
 "Venus Mourning" - 4:39
 "Worn Out Wings" - 3:30
 "Fixed Like Medication" - 3:41
 "Obsidian Halo" - 3:27
 "Light of Day" - 2:29
 "Requiem" - 3:08
 "Bleed Together" - 3:11
 "Smut Queen" - 3:31
 "Portrait" - 2:56

Personnel
Matt McChesney – vocals
Matt Johnson – guitar, keys, bass
Tommy Church – lead guitar, bass
Jonathon Lee – studio drums

References

2009 albums
The Autumn Offering albums
Victory Records albums
Albums produced by Mark Lewis (music producer)